The Shakori were an indigenous people of the Southeastern Woodlands. They were thought to be a Siouan people, closely allied with other nearby tribes such as the Eno and the Sissipahaw.  As their name is also recorded as Shaccoree, they can be confused with the Sugaree, but the latter are Catawba people.

Yardley in 1654 wrote about a Tuscarora guide's accounts of the Cacores people from Haynoke who, although smaller in stature and number, were able to evade the Tuscarora. Their villages were located around what is now Hillsborough, North Carolina along the banks of the Eno and Shocco rivers.

Culture
Although little is known about the Shakori, at the time of contact, they were not noted as being noticeably different from the surrounding tribes.  They made their wigwams and other structures out of interwoven saplings and sticks; these were covered in mud as opposed to the bark typically used by other nearby tribes. They were described as being similar to traditional dwellings of the Quapaw from Arkansas. In the center of the village, men often played a slinging stone game, probably similar to the chunkey played by tribes further south and west.

Language
The Shakori were associated with other Siouan tribes of the Piedmont, such as the Sissipahaw and Eno, and they all are believed to have spoken the same Siouan language. Scholars debate whether the Shakori, Eno, and Sissipahaw were different tribes or bands of the same tribe. This distinction became moot as the tribes merged with one another as their numbers decreased. Although they merged into remnants of other tribes and the larger Catawba, their Siouan dialect survived as late as 1743 among the Eno. They resisted Catawba assimilation the longest.

History
Although their origins are uncertain, the Shakori were among the Siouan-speaking tribes found in the Piedmont area of numerous southern states. They are believed to have joined against the English colonists in the Yamasee War.  It is likely that by this time they were already confederated or merged with remnants of other tribes, such as the Saponi. On February 27, 1714, the Virginia colony reached an agreement. The remnants of the Saponi, Tottero, Occaneechi, Keyauwee, Enoke (or Eno), and Shakori formally coalesced, becoming "The Saponi Nation".  Descendants with partial Shakori ancestry are likely among the Catawba and other regional groups, but the Shakori are extinct as a tribe.

Notes

Extinct Native American peoples
Siouan peoples
Native American tribes in North Carolina
Indigenous peoples of the Southeastern Woodlands